Joseph Watson (1907 – after 1928) was an English footballer who played as a right back in the Football League for Darlington. He played non-league football for White-le-Head Rangers and Lintz Colliery, from where he signed professionally with Darlington in February 1929. He made his debut in the Third Division North match against New Brighton on 9 February, taking the place of Walter Holmes, and finished the season, and his Darlington career, with eleven appearances in the league.

References

1907 births
Year of death missing
Footballers from Gateshead
English footballers
Association football fullbacks
Darlington F.C. players
English Football League players
Date of birth missing
Place of death missing